The Beach Boulevard is a single carriageway road in the city of Aberdeen, Scotland. It is also locally known as the Beach Bouley, the Bouley and the Boulevard. At the east end, it has a junction with the Beach Esplanade. Codonas Amusement Park and Aberdeen Science Centre are located here. The Chinese State Circus and the Moscow State Circus are regularly hosted at the site during the summer months.

References

Streets in Aberdeen